Events from the year 1931 in Canada.

Incumbents

Crown 
 Monarch – George V

Federal government 
 Governor General – Freeman Freeman-Thomas, 1st Marquess of Willingdon (until April 4) then Vere Ponsonby, 9th Earl of Bessborough
 Prime Minister – Richard Bedford Bennett
 Chief Justice – Francis Alexander Anglin (Ontario)
 Parliament – 17th

Provincial governments

Lieutenant governors 
Lieutenant Governor of Alberta – William Egbert (until May 5) then William Legh Walsh 
Lieutenant Governor of British Columbia – Robert Randolph Bruce (until July 18) then John William Fordham Johnson 
Lieutenant Governor of Manitoba – James Duncan McGregor  
Lieutenant Governor of New Brunswick – Hugh Havelock McLean 
Lieutenant Governor of Nova Scotia – Frank Stanfield (until September 25) then Walter Harold Covert (from October 5)
Lieutenant Governor of Ontario – William Donald Ross (until October 25) then William Mulock 
Lieutenant Governor of Prince Edward Island – Charles Dalton 
Lieutenant Governor of Quebec – Henry George Carroll 
Lieutenant Governor of Saskatchewan – Henry William Newlands (until March 31) then Hugh Edwin Munroe

Premiers 
Premier of Alberta – John Edward Brownlee   
Premier of British Columbia – Simon Fraser Tolmie
Premier of Manitoba – John Bracken 
Premier of New Brunswick – John Baxter (until May 19) then Charles Dow Richards 
Premier of Nova Scotia – Gordon Sidney Harrington
Premier of Ontario – George Stewart Henry 
Premier of Prince Edward Island – Walter Lea (until August 29) then James D. Stewart 
Premier of Quebec – Louis-Alexandre Taschereau 
Premier of Saskatchewan – James Thomas Milton Anderson

Territorial governments

Commissioners 
 Gold Commissioner of Yukon – George Ian MacLean 
 Commissioner of Northwest Territories – William Wallace Cory (until March 31) then Hugh Rowatt

Events
May 19 – Charles Richards becomes premier of New Brunswick, replacing John Baxter
August 29 – James D. Stewart becomes premier of Prince Edward Island for the second time, replacing Walter Lea
November 12 – Maple Leaf Gardens opens in Toronto
September 29 – Striking coal miners clash with the Royal Canadian Mounted Police in the Estevan riot.
December 11 – the Statute of Westminster goes into effect: Canada is granted full legislative independence in national and international affairs, with the Crown represented by the Governor General.
The Beauharnois Scandal breaks out

Sport 
March 27 - The Manitoba Junior Hockey League's Elmwood Millionaires win their only Memorial Cup by defeating Ottawa City Junior Hockey League's Ottawa Primroses 2 games to 1. The deciding Game 3 was played at Ottawa Auditorium
April 14 - The Montreal Canadiens win their fourth Stanley Cup by defeating the Chicago Black Hawks 3 game to 2. The deciding game was played at the Montreal Forum
November 12 - Maple Leaf Gardens opens
December 5 - The Montreal AAA Winged Wheelers win their first and only Grey Cup by defeating the Regina Roughriders 22 to 0 in the 19th Grey Cup played Percival Molson Memorial Stadium in Montreal

Births

January to March

January 5 - Percy Schmeiser, businessman, farmer, and politician (d. 2020)
January 6 - Dickie Moore, ice hockey player, businessman and philanthropist
January 7 - Elizabeth Kishkon, politician (d. 2018)
January 19 - Robert MacNeil, journalist
January 27 - Mordecai Richler, author, screenwriter and essayist (d. 2001)
January 30 - John Crosbie, politician and Minister (d. 2020)
February 16 - Bernie Geoffrion, ice hockey player (d. 2006)
February 17 - Mark MacGuigan, academic and politician (d. 1998)
February 26 - C. William Doody, politician and Senator (d. 2005)
March 10 - Georges Dor, author, composer, playwright, singer, poet, translator and theatrical producer and director (d. 2001)
March 12 - Danny Lewicki, Canadian professional ice hockey player (d. 2018) 
March 22 - William Shatner, actor and novelist
March 22 - Monte Kwinter, politician
March 25 - Jack Chambers, artist and filmmaker (d. 1978)
March 28 - Jane Rule, novelist and non-fiction writer (d. 2007)
March 30 - Gérard Bruchési, politician

April to June

April 2 - Howard Engel, writer and television producer (d. 2019)
April 9 - Richard Hatfield, politician and 26th Premier of New Brunswick (d. 1991)
April 13 - Cliff Lumsdon, world champion marathon swimmer (d. 1991)
April 15 - Helen Maksagak, politician, first woman and first Inuk Northwest Territories Commissioner (d. 2009)
April 19 - Walter Stewart, writer, editor and journalism educator (d. 2004)
April 22 - John Buchanan, lawyer, politician and 27th Premier of Nova Scotia
April 29 - Chris Pearson, 1st Premier of the Yukon (d. 2014)
May 18 - Clément Vincent, politician (d. 2018) 
May 22 - Arthé Guimond, Roman Catholic prelate, Archbishop of Grouard-McLennan (2000–2006) (d. 2013).
May 24 - Bruce Owen, politician and lawyer (d. 2022)
May 25 - Herb Gray, politician, Canada's first Jewish federal cabinet minister
June 23 - Charles Keith Taylor, politician
June 25 - Stan Dromisky, politician
June 27 - Charles Bronfman, businessman and philanthropist
June 30 - Joyce Wieland, experimental filmmaker and mixed media artist (d. 1998)

July to September
July 2 - Robert Ito, actor
July 5 - Peter Silverman, broadcast journalist (d. 2021)
July 6 - Jean Campeau, Quebec businessman and politician
July 7 - Charles Alexander Best, politician (d. 1978)
July 10 - Alice Munro, short-story writer
July 15 - Jacques-Yvan Morin, politician
July 19 - Allan Slaight, rock and roll radio pioneer, media mogul, and philanthropist (d. 2021)
July 20 - Gilles Morin, politician
August 18 - Bramwell Tillsley, General of The Salvation Army
August 29 - Lise Payette, politician, feminist, writer and columnist
August 30 - Frank Zakem, politician and businessman (d. 2013)
August 31 - Jean Béliveau, ice hockey player
September 23 - Gerald Merrithew, politician (d. 2004)

October to December

October 4 - Werner Israel, physicist
October 8 - Isadore Sharp, businessman
November 5 - Charles Taylor, philosopher
November 8 – Morley Safer, journalist (60 Minutes) (d. 2016)
November 13 - Andrée Lachapelle, actress (d. 2019)
November 28 - George Ramsay Cook, historian
November 30 - Harry Enns, politician

Deaths

July 10 - Louise McKinney, first woman sworn into the Legislative Assembly of Alberta and first woman elected to a legislature in Canada and in the British Empire (b. 1868)
July 28 - Charles Doherty, politician and jurist (b. 1855)
November 10 - Henrietta Edwards, women's rights activist and reformer (b. 1849)
December 30 - George Eulas Foster, politician and academic (b. 1847)

Full date unknown
Fred Dixon, politician (b. 1881)

See also
 List of Canadian films

Historical documents
Greater autonomy enacted in Statute of Westminster, ending (with exceptions) British parliament's power over Canada

Before Statute's passage, PM Bennett affirms that it will not affect Constitution's amending process or division of powers

Liberals assert that preserving British parliament's Constitution amending power is not subordination, but done "by our own agreement"

MP Henri Bourassa says Statute of Westminster incites "national spirit superior to all provincial, religious and racial prejudices"

Solicitor General backs consultation with provinces in amendment of Constitution or imperial statutes

Prime Minister's New Year greeting after "a year of difficulty and of testing" that has proven "soundness of our economic structure"

Federal budget includes "imposts that will be felt by everyone in the Dominion in a most direct manner"

Canada not encouraging immigration, and those who do come should have funds to support them for at least six months

Year-end assessment points to Canada's resource and financial assets as well as agriculture troubles and government "extravagance"

Saskatchewan labour groups form political party with platform including nationalization, debt relief and planned economy

Canadian Communists defiant following arrest of comrades for sedition under Criminal Code Section 98

Canadian-born evangelist ministers to new immigrants in California with philosophy that no one is alien in eyes of God

Unlike one-industry cities, Toronto is widely diversified in industrial, commercial and financial enterprises

Toronto Star newsletter encourages carriers with success stories, prizes and "One Order a Day" Club

References

 
Years of the 20th century in Canada
Canada
1931 in North America
1930s in Canada